A Skin, A Night is a 2008 documentary film featuring the American indie rock band The National. The film is directed by Vincent Moon, and was released simultaneously with the band's compilation The Virginia EP on May 20, 2008.

The film documents the recording process of the band's fourth studio album, Boxer (2007).

Critical reception
In a positive review, Popmatters''' J.M. Suarez noted: "It may even be misleading to call A Skin, A Night a documentary, as it rejects many of the standard techniques many would expect from such a project. In a similar way to AJ Schnack's Kurt Cobain: About a Son'', Moon makes use of cityscapes, landscapes, and still images to paint a unique picture of a band at work, as well as offer a more complete picture of the band."

References

2008 films
2008 documentary films
American documentary films
Rockumentaries
The National (band)
Films directed by Vincent Moon
2000s English-language films
2000s American films